Duane Allen Walker (born March 15, 1957) is a retired Major League Baseball outfielder. He played for five seasons at the major league level for the Cincinnati Reds, Texas Rangers, and St. Louis Cardinals. He was drafted by the Reds in the 1st round (22nd pick) of the secondary phase of the 1976 amateur draft.

Walker was selected as the Most Valuable Player (MVP) of the 1979 Southern League All-Star Game in which he hit an RBI single, drew a walk, stole two bases, and completed a double play from third base.

References

External links

1957 births
Living people
Cincinnati Reds players
Texas Rangers players
St. Louis Cardinals players
Major League Baseball outfielders
San Jacinto Central Ravens baseball players
Baseball players from Texas
Eugene Emeralds players
Nashville Sounds players
Tampa Tarpons (1957–1987) players